The AfroBasket (alternatively known as the FIBA Africa Championship, FIBA African Championship, or FIBA AfroBasket) is the men's basketball continental championship contested by the senior national teams of Africa, played once every four years.

Through the 2015 edition, the tournament took place every two years and also served as a qualifying tournament for the FIBA World Cup and the Summer Olympic Games. However, since 2017, the AfroBasket along with all other men's FIBA continental championships are no longer a part of the qualifying process for the World Cup or the Olympics.

Qualification
Sixteen African teams qualify for the finals tournament. Before the 2021 edition, the qualification format for teams was via the different FIBA Africa subzones from Zone 1 to Zone 7. Each subzone conducted a qualification tournament a year before the championship to determine the qualifying teams. Six subzones received two berths each, while Zone 1 only received one. The host and the champion from the preceding AfroBasket also got a berth each, while two or three teams were selected as wild cards. However, beginning with the 2021 tournament, FIBA changed the qualification format where wild cards are no longer given and the preceding champion is no longer guaranteed an automatic berth. All teams now have to enter the qualification process. While teams who fail to qualify for the prior AfroBasket will go through pre-qualifiers for the opportunity to reach the next AfroBasket competition.

Summaries

 A round-robin tournament determined the final standings.

Medal table

Tournament awards
Most recent award winners (2021)

The awards were announced on 5 September 2021.

Participating nations

See also
 AfroCan
 FIBA Basketball World Cup
 Basketball at the Olympic Games
 Basketball at the African Games
 FIBA Africa Clubs Champions Cup
 FIBA U18 African Championship
 FIBA U16 African Championship

Notes

References

External links

FIBA Archive
Men's Basketball Africa Championship (todor66.com)
Men's Basketball Africa Championship (the–sports.org)

 
Basketball competitions in Africa between national teams
African championships
Recurring sporting events established in 1962